M1-63 (catalogued as VV 209, IRAS 18486-1314 and as 2MASS J18513095-1310367) is a bipolar planetary nebula in the constellation of Scutum.

See also
 List of nebulae
 Wikipedia Project: Astronomical Objects

References

Scutum (constellation)
Planetary nebulae